The McFadden Act is a United States federal law, named after Louis Thomas McFadden, member of the United States House of Representatives and Chairman of the United States House Committee on Banking and Currency, enacted in 1927 from recommendations made by former Comptroller of the Currency Henry May Dawes.

The Act sought to give national banks competitive equality with state-chartered banks by letting national banks branch to the extent permitted by state law. The McFadden Act specifically prohibited interstate branching by allowing each national bank to branch only within the state in which it is situated.  Under a grandfather clause, three major banks were allowed to continue conducting interstate banking (Northwestern National Bank, First Bank Stock Corporation, and First Western Bank).

Although the Riegle-Neal Interstate Banking and Branching Efficiency Act of 1994 repealed this provision of the McFadden Act, it specified that state law continues to control intrastate branching, or branching within a state's borders, for both state and national banks.

See also
 Bank Holding Company Act of 1956

References

External links
Information from the Office of the Comptroller of the Currency
Bank Geographic Structure
Public Law 639, 69th Congress, H.R. 2: an Act to Further Amend the National Banking Laws and the Federal Reserve Act. [McFadden Act]

1927 in law
United States federal banking legislation